Chuckery may refer to:

Chuckery, a suburb of Walsall, England
Chuckery, Ohio, an unincorporated community in Ohio, United States
The Chuckery, a former football ground in Walsall, England